Gulich or Gülich may refer to:

Places
Gulich Township, Clearfield County, Pennsylvania
Jülich, a town in Germany, also known as Gülich

People
Jeremias Friedrich Gülich (1733–1808), German dyer
John Percival Gülich (1864–1898), British artist
Marie Gülich (born 1994), German basketball player
Wilhelm Gülich (1895–1960), German politician
Thomas Gulich (1961), Swiss manager